Shahriari Rural District is in Chahak District of Khatam County, Yazd province, Iran. At the time of the National Census of 2016, its constituent villages were a part of Chahak Rural District in the Central District. The rural district was elevated to the status of a district and divided into two rural districts. The village of Shahriari-ye Olya was appointed the capital of Shahriari Rural District. Its population in 2016 was 708 people.

References 

Khatam County

Rural Districts of Yazd Province

Populated places in Yazd Province

Populated places in Khatam County

fa:دهستان شهریاری (شهرستان خاتم)